Tshuma is a Zimbabwean surname. Notable people with the surname include:

Charlton Tshuma (born 1993), Zimbabwean cricketer
Jabulisa Tshuma (born 1998), Zimbabwean cricketer
Johnson Tshuma (born 1970), Zimbabwean boxer
Loreen Tshuma, (born 1996), Zimbabwean cricketer
Novuyo Tshuma (born 1988), Zimbabwean writer and professor of creative writing
Nthokozo Tshuma (born 1985), retired Zimbabwean football midfielder
Petronella Tshuma (born 1990), Zimbabwean-born actress
Schillo Tshuma (born 1992), Zimbabwean footballer

Zimbabwean surnames
Bantu-language surnames